Jean-Pierre le Roux (born 19 April 1993) is a South African cricketer. He made his first-class debut for North West in the 2016–17 Sunfoil 3-Day Cup on 23 March 2017.

References

External links
 

1993 births
Living people
South African cricketers
North West cricketers
Place of birth missing (living people)